The Alfa Romeo 430 is a 5-ton truck produced by Alfa Romeo between 1942 and 1950. It started as military project (430RE) based on the larger Alfa Romeo 800 truck. Some of the trucks were converted into anti-aircraft vehicles equipped with a machine-gun of  IF Scotti. The truck was produced as of commercial version after the war.
Both military and civilian version was produced until 1950.

The 430 was equipped with 5.8 L straight-4 diesel engine which could produce  at 2000 rpm.

Notes 

Alfa Romeo trucks
Vehicles introduced in 1942
Military trucks of Italy